Petrus de Dacia may refer to:

Petrus de Dacia (mathematician) (c. 1250–c. 1310)
Petrus de Dacia (Swedish monk) (1235–1289)